The canton of Fougères-2 is an administrative division of the Ille-et-Vilaine department, in northwestern France. It was created at the French canton reorganisation which came into effect in March 2015. Its seat is in Fougères.

It consists of the following communes: 
 
La Bazouge-du-Désert 
Beaucé
La Chapelle-Janson
Le Ferré
Fleurigné
Fougères (partly)
Laignelet
Landéan
Le Loroux
Louvigné-du-Désert
Luitré-Dompierre
Mellé
Monthault
Parigné
Poilley
Saint-Georges-de-Reintembault
La Selle-en-Luitré
Villamée

References

Cantons of Ille-et-Vilaine